The 1973 US Navy C-117D Sólheimasandur Crash, commonly known as the Sólheimasandur Crash, is a crashed US Navy Douglas C-117D located in  on the southern coast of Iceland. The remains of the aircraft - which crashed in 1973 - have remained relatively intact, leading to the crash site becoming a tourist destination.

Accident
The accident aircraft was flying from Hofn Hornafjördur Airport to Naval Air Station Keflavik, after delivering supplies for the radar station at Stokksnes. En-route the aircraft encountered severe icing and the crew were forced to land on a frozen river at Sólheimasandur. All 7 crew members survived and were rescued by helicopter, but the aircraft was written off (surveyed in USN parlance). The unsalvaged remains of the aircraft were left at the scene.

Aircraft
The aircraft serial number 17171, was designated C-117D and was based on the Super DC-3, first flown in 1944. Note that this R4D-8 was built as an R4D-5 (msn 12554) and converted to R4D-8 (msn 43309) in November 1951. All R4D-8 aircraft still extant were re-designated as C-117D in the tri-service designation system introduced from 18 September 1962.

Summary
Forced to land due to severe icing, 17171 was written off and unsalvaged parts of the aircraft remained at the site.

As of 2022, the fuselage of the aircraft remains relatively intact, leading to the site becoming a popular tourist destination. The wreck has accumulated superficial damage from graffiti, gunfire, and tourists over the years. Tours to the site are available and the trek back-and-forth takes about two to three hours.

In January 2020, two Chinese tourists died of hypothermia near the wreckage after getting caught in a storm that went over the area. A month later, SAR units had to rescue several tourists that had ignored a warning from the police to not trek to the wreckage due to deteriorating weather in the area.

Popular culture 
The crash site of the DC-3 was featured in Justin Bieber's 2015 album I'll Show You.
American musician George Hirsch's 2016 album Hijrah used an image of the Sólheimasandur crash as its cover.

The show Top Gear America featured in the episode "Viking Trucks" while in Iceland.

 A music video of song named Gerua, from the Indian film "Dilwale" was shot at this site, in which lead actors Shah Rukh Khan and Kajol are seen standing on the wreckage. The site eventually gained popularity among Indian tourists after the release of the song.
The site was also featured in the music video "Let Me In", an orchestral ballad song from the Korean girl group Loona's third single release, HaSeul.

 The crash site of the DC-3 was featured in Emis Killa's song Mercurio.

 The site is featured in the Netflix sci-fi drama Katla.

References 

Tourist attractions in Iceland
Accidents and incidents involving the Douglas C-47 Skytrain
Aviation accidents and incidents in 1973
Aviation accidents and incidents in Iceland
1973 in Iceland
Accidents and incidents involving United States Navy and Marine Corps aircraft